Jimmy Jordan may refer to:
Jimmy Jordan (quarterback) (born 1958), American football quarterback for Tampa Bay Bandits
Jimmy Jordan (running back) (born 1944), American football running back for New Orleans Saints
Jimmy Jordan (baseball) (1908–1957), American baseball player

See also
James Jordan (disambiguation)